was a Japanese anime screenwriter and the creator of the fictional universe of "Cosmic Era" the setting for the anime Mobile Suit Gundam SEED (in which she was the head writer) and its related series. Born in Urawa, Saitama, Saitama City, Saitama Prefecture, Kantou Region, Japan. Blood type: O. An older sister of Kazuyuki Morosawa. She was the wife of Mitsuo Fukuda, and the mother of their children.

Family
He is also the screenwriter for the Atashin'chi anime movie in the year of 2003.

Life
She first met Mitsuo Fukuda during their school days when she was an amateur doujin artist and writer. They enrolled in different high school, but participated in the doujin fandom community, and remained friends after their graduation.

Even though she later graduated from the junior college with her child care (保育科) academic degree she would later become an office worker, while he joined Sunrise in 1979, at the age of 19.

They eventually married in 2006, and she retired from scriptwriting to become a housewife.  As of April 2008, she had two children with him.

Career
Although she did not write for an anime until Future GPX Cyber Formula Saga, her husband consulted with her since the beginning of the Future GPX Cyber Formula, the first anime series that he directed.

She is the creator of the fictional universe of "Cosmic Era", the setting for the anime Mobile Suit Gundam SEED (in which, together with its sequel Mobile Suit Gundam SEED Destiny, she was the head writer) and its related series. It would later be used by other writers, like in the spin-offs Mobile Suit Gundam SEED Astray and Mobile Suit Gundam SEED Stargazer.

In the year of 2002, after the end of Mobile Suit Gundam SEED production, her medical diagnosis revealed the presence of ovarian cyst and Uterine Fibroid. Although she managed to complete the outline for the plot for Gundam Seed Destiny, the requirement of continuous treatment for her illness led to her handing over the actual writing duties to other staff members at Sunrise, and resultantly the indefinite postponement of the Mobile Suit Gundam SEED Movie.

In 2014, she scripted a series of drama CD's featuring Mobile Suit Gundam SEED characters for the "Mobile Suit Gundam SEED Destiny HD Remaster Blu-ray Box". They were entitled "Omake Quarters".

Death
She died on 19 February 2016, at the age of 56, from aortic dissection.

Works
Future GPX Cyber Formula
Future GPX Cyber Formula Saga
Future GPX Cyber Formula Sin
Outlaw Star, Episode 9
Gear Fighter Dendoh
Mobile Suit Gundam SEED
Mobile Suit Gundam SEED Re:
Mobile Suit Gundam SEED: Special Edition
Mobile Suit Gundam SEED Destiny
Mobile Suit Gundam SEED Destiny: Special Edition

References

Further reading
Gamest World series Vol.19, 1999 : "新世紀GPXサイバーフォーミュラ OVAシリーズコンプリートファイル(Future GPX Cyber Formula OVA series Complete file)" by Shinseisha 新声社
機動戦士ガンダムSEEDコズミック・イラ メカニック&ワールド(Mobile Suit Gundam SEED Cosmic Era Mechanic & World) by Futabasha 双葉社
Animage Magazine April 2008
The Big Issue Japan No.120, June 2009
Gundam 30th Anniversary Official Book

External links

Chiaki Morosawa at IMDb

1959 births
2016 deaths
Deaths from aortic dissection
Japanese screenwriters
Anime screenwriters